Wedding Night (French: Nuit de noces) is a 2001 Canadian comedy film.

Plot

After winning a contest Florence and Nicolas set out to get married in Niagara Falls accompanied by their family and friends. No sooner do they arrive than the situation turns sour, and the couple decides to call the whole thing off. Stuck in an unfamiliar town with their respective relatives, Florence and Nicolas have their illusions shattered regarding love and living as a couple. In their own ways the members of both families try to reconcile the ex-future husband and wife, but things are not so simple.

Recognition

 2002 - Golden Reel Award - Won
 2002 - Jutra Award Best Sound - Nominee
 2002 - Jutra Award Best Supporting Actress - Nominee

References

External links 
 
 
 
 

2001 films
2001 comedy films
Canadian comedy films
Films shot in Montreal
2000s French-language films
Films directed by Émile Gaudreault
French-language Canadian films
2000s Canadian films